Tengiz Karamanovich Khubuluri (born 24 May 1955) is a retired Georgian half-heavyweight judoka. He won the world title in 1979 and 1981, the European title in 1976 and 1979, and finished second at the 1980 Olympics. In 1979 he was named Georgian Athlete of the Year.

References

External links

 

1955 births
Living people
Male judoka from Georgia (country)
Soviet male judoka
Olympic judoka of the Soviet Union
Judoka at the 1980 Summer Olympics
Olympic silver medalists for the Soviet Union
Olympic medalists in judo
Medalists at the 1980 Summer Olympics